Barkhudarly is an abandoned Azerbaijani village in the Qazakh District of Azerbaijan, under the de facto control of Armenia. Along with the similarly abandoned village of Sofulu, Barxudarlı forms a  exclave of Azerbaijan surrounded by Armenia's Tavush Province.

History 
Following a four-day siege, the village was captured by the Armenian Armed Forces on 27 April 1992, during the First Nagorno-Karabakh War. The exclave has been under the control of Armenia ever since and is administered as part of the surrounding Tavush Province.

References 

Populated places in Qazax District
Enclaves and exclaves